Melawati Football Club, is a Malaysian semi-professional football club based in Taman Melawati, Ulu Klang, Selangor. They currently play in the third-tier division in Malaysian football, the Malaysia M3 League. The club is also involved in the Malaysia FA Cup.

History
The club founded in 2014 in Taman Melawati, Selangor and participated in several competitions in Klang Valley. The club is the first team in the Klang Valley League to win four consecutive league titles (2014, 2015, 2016, and 2017).

In 2018, the club has won the Selangor Social Premier League and been eligible to compete in the Malaysia M3 League.

On 17 February 2019, the club competed in the Malaysia FA Cup for the first time in the club's history.

Starting from 2020 season, the club has been rebranded to Melawati Football Club.

Season by season record
Updated on 8 June 2020.

Notes:   2020 Season cancelled due to the 2020 Coronavirus Pandemic, no promotion or league title was awarded although this is now subject to a possible legal challenge

Players

First-team squad

Management team

Club personnel
 Manager: 
 Assistant Manager: 
 Head coach: Mat Zan Mat Aris
 Assistant coach : Zhafrizan Abu Bakar Goalkeeping coach: Muzaffar Shah Dzulkafli Fitness coach: 
 Physio : 

 Honours 

 Domestic competitions 
 League 
 Klang Valley League Gombak  Winners (4): 2014, 2015, 2016, 2017Selangor Social Premier League  Winners (1)': 2018

References

External links
Official Facebook Page
 Official Twitter Page

Malaysia M3 League
Football clubs in Malaysia